Josep Domènech i Estapà (Tarragona, 1858 – Cabrera de Mar, 1917) was a Catalan architect.

He graduated in 1881, and became professor of geodesy (1888) and descriptive geometry (1895) at the University of Barcelona, and member of the  Acadèmia de Ciències i Arts (1883), of which he subsequently became president(1914).

His works in Barcelona include the church of Sant Andreu del Palomar (1881, with Pere Falqués), Teatre Poliorama and Reial Acadèmia de les Ciències (1883), Palau de la Justícia - Palace of Justice courthouse (1887-1908, with Enric Sagnier i Villavecchia), Palau Montaner, now the Delegación del Gobierno Español (Delegation of the Spanish Government) in Barcelona (1889-1896, with Lluís Domènech i Montaner), the University of Barcelona's Faculty of Medicine (1904),  Modelo prison (1904, with Salvador Vinyals i  Sabaté), the  Amparo de Santa Lucía / Empar de Santa Llúcia home for the blind, which eventually became the  Museu de la Ciència de Barcelona, now known as CosmoCaixa Barcelona (1904-1909), the Fabra Observatory (1906), Catalana de Gas i electricitat building and water tower (1908), the Church of Our Lady of Carmen (Església de la Mare de Déu del Carme) and Carmelite convent (1910-1921, finished by his son Josep Domènech i Mansana) and  Magoria station (1912). He also headed the construction of the Hospital Clínic (1895-1906), based on a design by Ignasi C. Bartrolí (1881). In the town of Viladrau, he built the Hotel Bofill (1898).

He created his own style through the modification of Classical motifs, distinct both from Eclecticism and Modernisme, but was accepted by the establishment. He wrote several books, including Tratado de geometría descriptiva and El modernismo arquitectónico (1911).

Gallery

External links

 
 Sergio Fuentes Milà, "L’estació de La Magòria. Un cas paradigmàtic de l’arquitectura industrial de Domènech i Estapà (1911-1912)", IX Jornades d'Arqueologia Industrial de Catalunya, desembre 2013 (En premsa)

Architects from Catalonia
Modernisme architects
Art Nouveau architects
1917 deaths
1858 births